Negin (: [nə'giːn]) is a Persian word. It means a rare diamond or stone, and also refers to the gemstone on a piece of jewelry, such as a ring or necklace. The direct translation of the word Negin is gem or other jewels with a luxurious look and high value.

It is a popular Persian female given name. Although it is a Persian name, it is also used in the Kurdish, Turkish and Armenian languages as a female name which may be transliterated in a number of ways, such as Nigina (نگینه) in Tajiki Persian, and Nagin or Nagina in Urdu. 

Negin was also an influential literary journal in Tehran. It was published under the editorship of Dr. Mahmood Enayat during the Mohammad Reza Pahlavi era.

References

Persian feminine given names
Feminine given names
Persian words and phrases